Kloc or KLOC may refer to:

People
Hy Kloc (1947-2022), American politician
Izabela Kloc (born 1963), Polish politician

Broadcast stations

United States
KLOC, a radio station in Turlock, California, broadcasting a Regional Mexican format
KUVS-DT, formerly KLOC-TV, a television station serving Sacramento, California

Other uses
Kloc, Pomeranian Voivodeship, in northern Poland
kLOC, for "thousands of source lines of code", a software development metric
Kingpin: Life of Crime, a video game